FC Karpaty Mukacheve was a Ukrainian football team from Mukacheve, Zakarpattia Oblast. The club was formed in 1946 as FC Bilshovyk.

History
Looking back throughout the history, in the city existed several football clubs that preceded current club. After the World War II in 1945 in Mukacheve were formed three football teams "Spartak" (represented a local tobacco factory), "Bilshovyk" (brewery), and "Dynamo" (law enforcement and border guards). On 13 May 1945, the local newspaper "Zakarpatska Pravda" was reporting its readers that the local Mukacheve Dynamo had hosted "Spartak-URSO" from Uzhhorod and beat it 10–1. Sometime a week later the same Dynamo Mukacheve beat Dynamo Berehove at home 5–2. Soon the chairman of the People's Council of Transcarpathian Ukraine Ivan Turyanytsia received an official invitation to send an athletic team of Zakarpattia of about 150 athletes to the Ukrainian Spartakiad that had been scheduled to take place 23 August to 6 September 1945.

In 1947 all three football teams were merged into one and named as Bilshovyk Mukacheve.

In Soviet competitions it participated rarely and with extensive pauses: 1948, 1949, 1968–1970, 1990. Based out of Mukacheve, Zakarpattia took part in the Ukrainian First League from its first championship in 1992. They were later sent down to Druha Liha after the 1996–97 season, and in couple of years folded.

In 1999 and 2000, a team named FC Mukachevo takes part in the regional championship. In 2001 the club takes part in the regional cup. In 2002 FC Mukachevo took part in the Ukrainian Football Cup among amateurs. After a two-year break, in 2003, already as Karpaty, the club started for the last time in the championship of the Transcarpathian region.

Team Names
 1946–1951: Bilshovyk
 1951: Iskra
 1955: Burevisnyk
 1962: Tochprylad
 1963: Mukachevprylad
 1964: Prylad
 1965–1966: Pryladyst
 1967: Prylad
 1968–1970: Karpaty
 1971–1993: Pryladyst
 1994–1998: Karpaty
 1999–2002: FK Mukacheve
 2003: Karpaty

Honors

Soviet Union
Soviet First League
Winners (1): 1948
Football Championship of the Ukrainian SSR 
Winners (1): 1947 (Bilshovyk)
Ukrainian republican championship among KFK
Winners (1): 1977 (Pryladyst)
Runners-up (1): 1971 (Karpaty)
Zakarpattia Oblast championship
Winners (2): 1962, 1988
Runners-up (2): 1966, 1967
Zakarpattia Oblast Cup
Winners (2): 1963, 1964, 1966

Ukraine
Ukrainian First League
 Runners-up (1): 1992 (group)
Zakarpattia Oblast championship

League and cup history

 Soviet Union (Zone "Ukraine", Group 1, or Group 4)

 Ukraine

Coaches
 1968–1968 Vasyl Zubak
 1970–1970 Fedir Vanzel
 1977–1977 Fedir Vanzel
 1991–1991 Mykola Tellinher
 1992–1992 Vilhelm Tellinher
 1992–1993 Ishtvan Sekech
 1993–1993 Hryhoriy Ishchenko
 1994–1995 Gabor Kachur
 1996–1997 Tiberiy Korponay
 1997–1997 Stefan Voitko
 1997–1997 Vasyl Turyanchyk
 1997–1998 Roman Pokora

See also
 FC Zakarpattia Uzhhorod
 FC Fetrovyk Khust

References

External links
 Karpaty team history
 Karpaty Mukachevo in footballfacts.ru (1946–1957)
 Karpaty Mukachevo in footballfacts.ru (1962–1998, 2003)
 Karpaty Mukachevo in footballfacts.ru (1999–2002)

 
1946 establishments in Ukraine
2003 disestablishments in Ukraine
Sport in Mukachevo
Football clubs in Zakarpattia Oblast
Association football clubs established in 1946
Association football clubs disestablished in 2003
Defunct football clubs in Ukraine